Below are the mintage figures for the Lincoln cent.

The following mint marks indicate which mint the coin was made at (parentheses indicate a lack of a mint mark):

P = Philadelphia Mint

D = Denver Mint

S = San Francisco Mint

W = West Point Mint

Lincoln Wheat reverse

Fraser's Lincoln cent

Lincoln Memorial reverse

Lincoln Bicentennial series

Union Shield reverse

References

One-cent coins of the United States